Ronald Paul Goebbel (born September 8, 1936) is a former Republican member of the Pennsylvania House of Representatives.
 He was born in Pittsburgh.

References

1936 births
Living people
Republican Party members of the Pennsylvania House of Representatives